Branko Peković (born 7 May 1979) is a Serbian water polo player now representing Kazakhstan. He was a member of the Serbia men's national water polo team which won the bronze medal at the 2008 Beijing Olympics.

Club
VK Bečej Naftagas
 LEN Euroleague  (1):  1999–2000

See also
 List of Olympic medalists in water polo (men)
 List of World Aquatics Championships medalists in water polo

References

External links
 

1979 births
Living people
Sportspeople from Belgrade
Serbian male water polo players
Kazakhstani male water polo players
Water polo centre forwards
Water polo players at the 2008 Summer Olympics
Medalists at the 2008 Summer Olympics
Olympic bronze medalists for Serbia in water polo
World Aquatics Championships medalists in water polo
European champions for Serbia and Montenegro
European champions for Serbia
Water polo players at the 2014 Asian Games
Medalists at the 2014 Asian Games
Asian Games medalists in water polo
Asian Games gold medalists for Kazakhstan